Kaminey (English: Rascal) is a 2009 Indian action thriller film directed by Vishal Bhardwaj and produced by Ronnie Screwvala. Shahid Kapoor, Priyanka Chopra, and Amol Gupte star in the lead roles. The film's screenplay was written by Bhardwaj, Abhishek Chaubey, Sabrina Dhawan, and Supratik Sen. Bhardwaj also composed the soundtrack of the film, with lyrics written by Gulzar. Kaminey was edited by A. Sreekar Prasad, and Meghna Manchanda Sen, and the cinematography was provided by Tassaduq Hussain. Set against the backdrop of the Mumbai underworld, the film focuses on the rivalry between identical twin brothers both played by Kapoor, one with a lisp and the other with a stutter,  over the course of a single day.

The film's soundtrack was also a critical and commercial success, with the song "Dhan Te Nan" topping the charts. Over the years, Kaminey achieved cult status. The film garnered awards and nominations in several categories, with praise for its direction, performance of the cast, screenplay, musical score, cinematography, editing and sound design.

At the 57th National Film Awards, Kaminey won Best Audiography for Subash Sahoo, whereas Prasad received a Special Jury Award for editing.  At the 55th Filmfare Awards, it received most nominations (ten), including Best Film, Best Director and Best Music Director for Bhardwaj, Best Actor for Kapoor, Best Actress for Chopra, and Best Supporting Actor for Gupte, winning the award for Best Special Effects. It received a leading 19 nominations at the 2010 Screen Awards, including Best Film, Best Director, Best Actor, and Best Actress; winning Best Actor Popular for Kapoor. Kaminey received the most nominations at the 2009 Star Guild Awards, including Best Film, Best Director and won two awards: Best Actor in a Negative Role for Gupte and Best Actress in a Leading Role for Chopra, her second consecutive win after Fashion (2008).

Accolades

See also
 List of Bollywood films of 2009

Footnotes

References

External links
 Accolades for Kaminey at the Internet Movie Database

Lists of accolades by Indian film